Asian Aerospace (AA) is an international trade fair for the aerospace business. Currently based in Hong Kong, it was held in Singapore since 1981 until disagreements between co-organisers Reed Exhibitions and Singapore Technologies in 2006 forced its relocation from 2007.

History
Asian Aerospace was held at the old Paya Lebar Airport in Singapore when it was first hosted in 1981. Organised by ITF, a British organiser, it grew to become the third largest airshow in the world, and was touted by its organisers as the "world’s second most influential airshow".
ITF was subsequently acquired by Reed Exhibitions in 1982. Held once every two years, it boasted 759 exhibiting companies from 37 countries, a total of 26,814 trade visitors from 81 countries recorded, and trade deals amounting to US$3.52 billion were concluded in the 2004 event.

The largest edition of the show was held from 21 February to 24 February 2006, the 13th and final show in Singapore. Held jointly with several conferences including the Asia Pacific Security Conference (APSEC), the C4I Asia Conference (C4i Asia), the Asia Pacific Airline Training Symposium (APATS), the Asian Aerospace UAV Asia-Pacific Conference and the IATA/Asian Aerospace Aviation Summit, it featured a rebranded Asian Defense Technology military component. At show's end, it drew 940 exhibitors from 43 countries, 34,300 trade participants from 89 countries and concluded a record US15.2 billion in sales.

Relocation
From 2008, the show moved from Singapore as Reed Exhibitions could not agree with the Government of Singapore over development plans for a new 24-hectare permanent exhibition site in Changi. While Reeds was still in negotiations to source for a new location, the Singapore government announced its intentions to organise the Singapore Airshow from 2008 in the absence of Asian Aerospace. It was revealed on 13 February 2006  that Reed has chosen AsiaWorld–Expo at Hong Kong International Airport island, Lantau Island, Hong Kong as the new site, with the first relocated show to be held in 2007 to avoid clashing with the Singapore Airshow the following year.

On 3 September 2007, the 4-day Asian Aerospace International Expo and Congress began in Hong Kong with 500 companies from 20 countries participating. The Airbus A380 was allowed to do a special flypast twice over the Victoria Harbour as part of the show. The Aircraft Interiors EXPO ASIA was held concurrently with the airshow, but the scaled-down show was without its military-related businesses due to political sensitivities in relation to China. Immediately prior to the event's commencement, Reeds announced over 500 exhibitors from over 20 countries and around 10,000 pre-registered trade visitors.

References

External links
Asian Aerospace Official Site
Movement of Asian Aerospace

Air shows
Aviation in Hong Kong
Aviation in Singapore